Exiguobacterium undrae is a bacterium. The DR14 strain of these bacteria has been found to eat polystyrene plastic. It was discovered in India, in wetlands by researchers in Shiv Nadar University. It was discovered alongside Exiguobacterium sibiricum strain DR11.

See also
 Organisms breaking down plastic

References

Bacillaceae
Organisms breaking down plastic
Bacteria described in 2002